The 1978–79 Syracuse Orangemen men's basketball team represented Syracuse University during the 1978–79 NCAA men's basketball season.
The team qualified for the NCAA Tournament, winning their first game against UCONN before losing in the second round to Penn.

Personnel

Schedule and results

|-
!colspan=9 style=| Regular Season

|-
!colspan=9 style=| ECAC Tournament

|-
!colspan=9 style=| NCAA Tournament

Rankings

References

Syracuse Orange men's basketball seasons
Syracuse
Syracuse
1978 in sports in New York (state)
1979 in sports in New York (state)